Wilfred Baddeley defeated Ernest Lewis 6–0, 6–1, 6–0 in the All Comers' Final, but the reigning champion Joshua Pim defeated Baddeley 10–8, 6–2, 8–6 in the challenge round to win the gentlemen's singles tennis title at the 1894 Wimbledon Championships.

Draw

Challenge round

All comers' finals

Top half

Bottom half

References

External links

Gentlemen's Singles
Wimbledon Championship by year – Men's singles